Palaszczuk Ministry may refer to the following governments of Queensland:

First Palaszczuk Ministry, 2015–2017
Second Palaszczuk Ministry, 2017–2020
Third Palaszczuk Ministry, from 2020